The 2010–11 Austrian Football Bundesliga is the 99th season of top-tier football in Austria. The competition was officially called tipp3-Bundesliga powered by T-Mobile, named after the Austrian betting company tipp3 and the Austrian branch of German mobile phone company T-Mobile. The season began in July 2010 and ended in May 2011. Red Bull Salzburg are the defending champions, having won their sixth title last season.

Teams
Austria Kärnten were relegated after finishing the 2009–10 season in 10th and last place. They were replaced by First League champions Wacker Innsbruck.

League table

Results
Teams played each other four times in the league. In the first half of the season each team played every other team twice (home and away), and then did the same in the second half of the season.

First half of season

Second half of season

Top goalscorers
Including matches played on 25 May 2011; Source:Austrian Bundesliga

See also
 2010–11 Austrian Cup
 2010–11 Austrian Football First League

References

External links
 Bundesliga website 
 oefb.at  
 soccerway.com
 Football scores for Austrian Bundesliga

Austrian Football Bundesliga seasons
Austria
1